Ann Dally (29 March 1926, in London – 24 March 2007, in Graffham, West Sussex) was an English author and psychiatrist.

Born Ann Gwendolen Mullins, she was the eldest child of the lawyer Claud William Mullins (1887–1968)  and his wife Elizabeth Gwendolen  Brandt (1904–1997). Dally studied at Somerville College, Oxford. She married Dr. Peter Dally in 1950. Dally was the first woman to study medicine at St Thomas' Hospital, London in 1953 and became a Harley Street Psychiatrist.

She undertook controversial treatment of heroin addicts and was put on trial by the General Medical Council and the National Health Service.  She wrote about her experience in A Doctor's Story (1990).

Bibliography
 An Intelligent Person's Guide to Modern Medicine (1966)
 Cicely: The Story of a Doctor (1968)
 The Birth of a Child: A Doctor's-eye-view Documentary of a Child Being Born (1969)
 Mothers: Their Power and Influence (1976)
 The Morbid Streak: Destructive Aspects of the Personality (1978)
 Why Women Fail: Achievement and Choice for Modern Women (1979)
 Inventing Motherhood: The Consequences of an Ideal (1982)
 A Doctor's Story (1990)
 Women Under the Knife - A history of surgery (1992) Hutchinson Radius, London 
 The Trouble with Doctors: Fashions, Motives and Mistakes (2003)

References

External links
 Dr Ann Dally, Reprint from The Guardian 30 March 2007
 Book Review A Doctor's Story from New Scientist 19 May 1990

1926 births
2007 deaths
English psychiatrists
20th-century English women writers
20th-century English writers
Alumni of Somerville College, Oxford
Alumni of King's College London
British women psychiatrists